Phymaturus spurcus, the climber lizard, is a species of lizard in the family Liolaemidae. It is from Argentina.

References

spurcus
Lizards of South America
Reptiles of Argentina
Endemic fauna of Argentina
Reptiles described in 1921
Taxa named by Thomas Barbour